Mark Zettl (born 28 December 1998) is a German footballer who plays as a midfielder for VfR Garching.

References

External links
 

1998 births
Living people
Footballers from Munich
German footballers
Association football midfielders
SpVgg Unterhaching players
VfR Garching players
3. Liga players